Helarius Axasman 'TC' Kisting (born 13 January 1994) is a Namibian rugby union player for Dinamo București. His regular position is scrum-half or fly-half.

Rugby career

In 2019 he signed the Romanian CSM Știința Baia Mare, where he won the Liga Națională de Rugby in 2020 and 2021. In 2022 Kisting moved to Dinamo București.

References

External links
 
 
 

Namibian rugby union players
Living people
1994 births
Rugby union scrum-halves
Rugby union fly-halves
Namibia international rugby union players
CSM Știința Baia Mare players